Balintus is a gossamer-winged butterfly genus of the tribe Eumaeini in the subfamily Theclinae. Its only known species, Balintus tityrus, is found in the Neotropical realm, where it is endemic to Colombia.

It is generally agreed that this butterfly represents a distinct lineage and is worthy of recognition at least as subgenus. However, there is some dispute about whether the name was validly established, or is a nomen nudum. The matter has been submitted to the ICZN for discussion.

References

Eumaeini
Lycaenidae of South America
Monotypic butterfly genera
Lycaenidae genera